Jo Brand Through the Cakehole is a British stand-up comedy television series produced by Channel X, and starring Jo Brand as the show's host. It debuted on 30 December 1993 in the United Kingdom and was broadcast on Channel 4 for three years, from 1993 to 1996.

References

External links
 
 

1990s British comedy television series
1993 British television series debuts
1996 British television series endings
Channel 4 comedy
British stand-up comedy television series